The Road to Camlann: The Death of King Arthur is the third book in Rosemary Sutcliff's Arthurian trilogy, after The Sword and the Circle and The Light Beyond the Forest. This book portrays the events that lead to the Battle of Camlann and the downfall of Camelot, including Guinevere and Lancelot's secret affair, and the betrayal of Arthur's illegitimate son Mordred.

When, at the end of the battle, Ector laments Lancelot, Sutcliff uses Thomas Malory's text from Le Morte d'Arthur.

External links
 Official website with more on book and author

References

1981 British novels
Novels by Rosemary Sutcliff
British children's novels
Modern Arthurian fiction
The Bodley Head books
Novels set in the 6th century
1981 children's books